Alexander Solovyov (last name alternatively transliterated Solovyev or Soloviev, and first name is often spelled as Aleksandr) may refer to:
Alexander Soloviev (historian) (1890–1971), Russian émigré Slavist
Alexander Soloviev (revolutionary) (1846–1879), Russian revolutionary
Alexander Solovyov (politician), Chairman of the State Council of the Udmurt Republic, Russia